Richard J. Hobbs FAA, is a distinguished professor, ARC Australian Laureate Fellow and ecologist at the University of Western Australia, Perth, Australia.  He is a fellow of the Australian Academy of Science and a Highly-Cited author who has written extensively in the areas of vegetation dynamics and management, ecosystem fragmentation, ecosystem rehabilitation and restoration, landscape ecology, and conservation biology. Current research focuses on managing ecosystems in a rapidly changing world.

Academic career 

An alumnus of Edinburgh University, Scotland, Richard obtained a 1st class honours in Ecological Science in 1976. He secured a Fulbright Scholarship to the University of California Santa Barbara, USA where he completed a master's degree in 1977. He completed his PhD at the University of Aberdeen, Scotland in 1982, working on post-fire dynamics of heathland communities, supervised by Prof Charles Gimingham.

His first postdoctoral research position was at Stanford University, working with Prof Hal Mooney on serpentine grassland dynamics.

In 1984 he joined the CSIRO Division of Wildlife & Ecology in Western Australia and worked on the dynamics of fragmented ecosystems in the Western Australian wheatbelt, becoming the Officer in Charge of the Western Australian laboratory in 1997.

In 2000 he took up a Chair in Environmental Science at Murdoch University and was awarded an ARC Australian Professorial Fellowship in 2006.

Moving to the University of Western Australia in 2009, he was awarded an Australian Laureate Fellowship by the Australian Research Council for research into "Intervention ecology: managing ecosystems in the 21st century".

Public and Professional Roles 

 President, Ecological Society of Australia 1998-1999
 President, International Association for Landscape Ecology 1999-2003
 Member, Scientific Advisory Committee, Worldwide Fund for Nature (Australia) 1997-2004
 Member, Invasive Species Specialist Group, IUCN Species Survival Commission
 Member, ARC Expert Advisory Panel (Engineering and Environment) 2001-2002
 Member, Board of Governors, Society for Ecological Restoration International 2003-2004
 Member, Wilderness Society Wildcountry Science Council 2003-2009
 Member, ARC College of Experts 2004-2005
 Member, Natural Heritage Trust Advisory Committee 2004-2007
 Member, Editorial Board, Ecological Management and Restoration 1999-2010
 Editor in Chief, Restoration Ecology, from 2005
 Member, Editorial Advisory Board, Landscape Ecology, from 2006

Awards 

 Fellow of the Australian Academy of Science
 ISI Highly Cited Researcher in Ecology and Environment
 Distinguished Scholarship Award, 1999, International Association for Landscape Ecology
 Finalist, 2001 Eureka Awards (The Royal Botanic Gardens Sydney Eureka Prize for Biodiversity Research)
 Australian Laureate Fellowship, 2009
 Finalist, 2010 Western Australian Scientist of the Year
 Winner, 2011 Western Australian Scientist of the Year
 Ecological Society of Australia, 2010 Gold Medal Recipient

Selected Recent Publications 

 Hobbs, R.J. & Suding, K.N. (eds.) 2009. New Models for Ecosystem Dynamics and Restoration. Island Press, Washington D.C.
 Suding, K.N. & Hobbs, R.J. 2009. Threshold models in conservation and restoration: A developing framework. Trends in Ecology and Evolution 24(5):271-279
 Jackson, S.T. & Hobbs, R.J. 2009. Ecological restoration in the light of ecological history. Science 325(5940):567-569.
 Hobbs, R.J., Higgs, E. & Harris, J.A. 2009.  Novel ecosystems: implications for conservation and restoration. Trends in Ecology and Evolution 24(11):599-605
 Lindenmayer, D.B., Bennett, A.F. & Hobbs, R.J. (eds) 2010. Temperate woodland conservation and management. CSIRO Publishing, Melbourne.
 Hobbs, R.J., Cole, D.N., Yung, L., Zavaleta, E.S., Aplet, G.H., Chapin, F.S.III, Landres, P.B., Parsons, D.J.,  Stephenson, N.L., White, P.S., Graber, D.M., Higgs, E.S., Millar, C.I.,  Randall, J.M.,  Tonnessen, K.A. & Woodley, S. 2010. Guiding concepts for parks and wilderness stewardship in an era of global environmental change. Frontiers in Ecology and Environment 8(9):483-490.
 Hobbs, R.J., Hallett, L.M., Ehrlich, P.R. & Mooney, H.A. 2011. Intervention ecology: applying ecological science in the 21st century. BioScience 61(6):442-450

External links 
 Ecosystem Restoration & Intervention Ecology Research Group
 ERIE Research Group, Uni of Western Australia
 Australian Research Council
 Centre of Excellence for Environmental Decisions
 Australian Academy of Science
 Awards recognise passion for science

References 

Year of birth missing (living people)
Living people
Alumni of the University of Edinburgh
University of California, Santa Barbara alumni
Australian ecologists
Australian environmentalists
Fellows of the Australian Academy of Science